Just is a surname. Notable people with the surname include:

Alexander Just (1874–1937), German/Hungarian chemist and inventor
Carl Just (1897–1990), Norwegian journalist
Cassià Maria Just (1926–2008), Catalan abbot
Ernest Everett Just (1883–1941), American biologist
Florian Just (born 1982), German pairs skater
Gabriele Just (born 1936), German chess player
Gustav Just (1921–2011), East German writer and editor
Jesper Just (born 1974), Danish artist
Joe Just (1916–2003), American baseball player
Johann August Just (c.1750–1791), German composer active in the Netherlands
John Just (1797–1852), English archaeologist and botanist
John Augustus Just (1854–1908), German-born American chemist and inventor
Karsten Just (born 1968), East German sprinter
Klaus Just (born 1964), West German sprinter
Marcel Just, American psychologist and cognitive neuroscientist
Myron Just (born 1941), American politician and farmer from North Dakota
Paul Just (born 1964), German-born Canadian pole vaulter
Theodore Just (1886–1937), British athlete
Ward Just (1935–2019), American writer

Surnames from given names